Marja-Sisko Aalto (born July 29, 1954) is a Finnish writer of detective fiction and former minister of the Evangelical Lutheran Church. She was the vicar of the Imatra parish from 1986 to 2010. She became notable as Finland's first openly transgender minister. In 2009, the Finnish Women's Association named Aalto . Since her resignation as vicar, she has pursued a career as a writer.

Early life and education
Alto was born on July 29, 1954, in Lappeenranta as the seventh of eight children and was assigned male at birth. She entered the faculty of theology at the University of Helsinki in 1973.

Clerical career
Aalto was the vicar of the Imatra parish from 1986 to 2010.

In November 2008, Aalto came out as trans woman and announced her intent to have sex reassignment surgery. According to Aalto, her parents had decided to give her the name Marja-Sisko if she had been born a girl, as they had hoped. She was preoccupied with the issue of gender from the age of three. Although her parents had wanted a girl, they did not accept her gender identity. For example, they were angry when Aalto, as a child, asked why she could not wear a skirt when all the other girls did.

Aalto's coming out as a trans woman caused a great controversy in the Church. The bishop of Mikkeli, Voitto Huotari, commented that there is no juridical obstacle for Aalto continuing as a vicar, but predicted that there would be problems. In 2009, almost 600 members left the Imatra parish. In November 2009, Aalto returned to the job of vicar after spending a year on leave. In March 2010, she requested to be allowed to resign, due in part to the discrimination she faced.

She was elected the notary of diocese for Kuopio by the Evangelical Lutheran Church in 2010.

Writing career
Since her resignation as vicar, Aalto has pursued a career as a writer of detective fiction. Aalto's first detective novel, Murder in the Cemetery, was published in Autumn 2013. Her second novel, Deadly Snow was published on National Veterans' Day (Finland) on April 27, 2015. The work is dedicated to the veterans of the Lapland War and continues the story of the protagonist of the previous book.

Personal life
Aalto has been married twice, and has three children.

Works

Annette Savolainen series

Others

References

Further reading

External links

1954 births
Living people
20th-century Finnish Lutheran clergy
21st-century Finnish Lutheran clergy
21st-century Finnish novelists
Detective fiction writers
Discrimination against transgender people
Finnish mystery writers
Finnish women novelists
LGBT Lutheran clergy
Finnish LGBT novelists
Finnish transgender people
Finnish crime fiction writers
People from Imatra
Transfeminists
Transgender women
Transgender novelists
Women Lutheran clergy